The Winthrop Street station is a station on the IRT Nostrand Avenue Line of the New York City Subway, located in Brooklyn at the intersection of Winthrop Street and Nostrand Avenue. The station is served by the 2 train at all times and the 5 train on weekdays.

History 
The Dual Contracts, which were signed on March 19, 1913, were contracts for the construction and/or rehabilitation and operation of rapid transit lines in the City of New York. The Dual Contracts promised the construction of several lines in Brooklyn. As part of Contract 4, the IRT agreed to build a subway line along Nostrand Avenue in Brooklyn. The construction of the subway along Nostrand Avenue spurred real estate development in the surrounding areas. The Nostrand Avenue Line opened on August 23, 1920, and the Winthrop Street station opened along with it.

From 1962 to 1964, the platforms at Winthrop Street were extended at either end to  so that they could accommodate 10-car trains. Platforms at other stations along the Nostrand Avenue Line were extended at this time.

The Flatbush Avenue-bound platform closed from March 18, 2019, and reopened to the public on July 1, 2019. This was so a staircase to the platform could be replaced. Upon the Flatbush Avenue-bound platform's reopening, the Manhattan-bound platform closed until July 29, 2019.

Station layout 

This underground station has two tracks and two side platforms which are slightly offset. Both platforms have their original 1920s Dual Contracts era tiling. The name tablets read "WINTHROP ST." in gold lettering on a blue background with a green and brown border. The trim line consists of a light brown center surrounded by green lines and a darker brown border. "W" tablets on a blue background and brown border run along the trim line at regular intervals.

At either ends of each platform, where they were extended in the 1960s to accommodate the current standard "A" Division train length of 510 feet (160 m), there are white tiles with name tablets reading "WINTHROP ST" in white sans serif face spelled on a blue background at regular intervals. All columns in the station are I-beams and are painted green.

Exits
Each platform has one fare control area one block apart from each other and there are no crossovers or crossunders to allow free transfers between directions. The one on the Manhattan-bound side, located on platform level, has a turnstile bank, token booth, and one staircase going up to the northeast corner of Winthrop Street and Nostrand Avenue.

The fare control area on the Flatbush Avenue-bound platform is unstaffed. Two ten-step staircases go up to a mezzanine where two exit-only turnstiles and one High Entry/Exit Turnstiles provides access to/from the station. Outside fare control, there is a single staircase going up to the southwest corner of Parkside and Nostrand Avenues, one block south of the staircase to the Manhattan-bound fare control area. Mosaic directional signs on the southbound platform indicate that it used to have an exit to Winthrop Street as well.

References

External links 

 

IRT Nostrand Avenue Line stations
New York City Subway stations in Brooklyn
Railway stations in the United States opened in 1920
1920 establishments in New York City
Flatbush, Brooklyn